The Great Synagogue of Iași is the oldest surviving synagogue in Romania, located in Iași. It is listed in the National Register of Historic Monuments.

History and architecture
Raised in 1671, the Great Synagogue is a free standing building adjacent to a small garden off Cucu Street (once called Sinagogilor Street for the many synagogues located on it) just north of the city center in the old Jewish neighbourhood of Târgu Cucului. The synagogue underwent major renovations in 1761, 1822 and 1864. It was partly restored in the 1970s and a major restoration took place between 2006 and 2018. The Women's Gallery houses a small museum of the Jewish community of Iași.

The building has round-arched windows, and two wings.  One wing is two stories high and capped by a barrel-vaulted ceiling. The other is a tall, single-story hall with a  diameter dome capped with a lantern. The dome was added to the building in the early 20th century.

Of the more than 110 synagogues in Iași before World War II, the Great Synagogue remains a witness of the Holocaust, and it is one of only two which continues to serve the dwindling Jewish community of Iași.

See also
History of the Jews in Iași
Pod Roșu Synagogue

References

External links

Great Synagogue of Iaşi at Beit HaTfutsot - The Museum of the Jewish People
Contributions to the History of Jews in Iaşi by Itic Svart-Kara

Ashkenazi Jewish culture in Romania
Ashkenazi synagogues
Historic monuments in Iași County
Jews and Judaism in Iași
Synagogues in Romania
17th-century synagogues
Religious buildings and structures in Iași
Religious buildings and structures completed in 1671
1671 establishments in Europe
Synagogue buildings with domes
Baroque synagogues